The 2024 United States Senate election in Rhode Island will be held on November 5, 2024, to elect a member of the United States Senate to represent the state of Rhode Island. Incumbent three-term Democratic Senator Sheldon Whitehouse was re-elected with 61.4% of the vote in 2018. Whitehouse is running for re-election to a fourth term in office.

Democratic primary

Candidates

Declared
Sheldon Whitehouse, incumbent U.S. Senator

Withdrew

General election

Predictions

References

External links
Official campaign websites
Sheldon Whitehouse (D) for Senate

2024
Rhode Island
United States Senate